Mongolia competed at the 1968 Summer Olympics in Mexico City, Mexico. 16 competitors, 12 men and 4 women, took part in 26 events in 4 sports.

Medalists

Silver
 Jigjidiin Mönkhbat — Wrestling, Men's freestyle middleweight

Bronze
 Chimedbazaryn Damdinsharav - Wrestling, Men's freestyle flyweight
 Danzandarjaagiin Sereeter - Wrestling, Men's freestyle lightweight
 Tömöriin Artag - Wrestling, Men's freestyle welterweight

Athletics

Gymnastics

Shooting

Three shooters, all men, represented Mongolia in 1968.

25 m pistol
 Tüdeviin Myagmarjav

50 m pistol
 Tüdeviin Myagmarjav

300 m rifle, three positions
 Yondonjamtsyn Batsükh

50 m rifle, three positions
 Mendbayaryn Jantsankhorloo
 Yondonjamtsyn Batsükh

50 m rifle, prone
 Yondonjamtsyn Batsükh
 Mendbayaryn Jantsankhorloo

Wrestling

References

External links
Official Olympic Reports
International Olympic Committee results database

Nations at the 1968 Summer Olympics
1968
Oly